Robert Ireland may refer to:

MPs
Robert Ireland (MP for Derby), in 1417, MP for Derby (UK Parliament constituency)
Robert Ireland (died 1599) (c. 1532–1599), MP for Shrewsbury
Robert de Ireland, MP for Lancashire (UK Parliament constituency)

Others
Robert Ireland (footballer, born 1900) (1900–?) for Liverpool
Robert Ireland (Australian footballer) (born 1948), for Fitzroy
Robert Livingston Ireland Jr. (1895–1981), American businessman
Robert Innes Ireland (1930–1993), British military officer, engineer, and motor racing driver